Anna N. Żytkow (born 21 February 1947) is a Polish astrophysicist working at the Institute of Astronomy of the University of Cambridge. Żytkow and Kip Thorne proposed a model for what is called the Thorne–Żytkow object, which is a star within another star. Żytkow in 2014 was part of the team led by Emily M. Levesque which discovered the first candidate for such an object.

Thorne-Żytkow objects
Working together with Kip Thorne in 1976, Żytkow developed a theoretical model for a new star type, the Thorne–Żytkow object (TŻO), which contains either a neutron star or a black hole core at the center of a stellar envelope. The evolution of such a star occurs rarely and only two processes exist that define the structure and evolution of a TŻO. In the first process a collision between a neutron star and a normal star, either dwarf or giant, must occur in order to merge the two into a single object. This occurrence is rare since stars do not usually collide with each other. This could only happen in a dense cluster of stars. The second possible evolution of a larger TŻO can occur when a  star expands into a red supergiant and engulfs its companion neutron star.

A team led by Emily Levesque (University of Colorado at Boulder)  and including Anna Żytkow found the first viable TŻO candidate using the 6.5-meter Magellan Clay Telescope at Las Campanas Observatory in 2014, possibly succeeding in a search for these bizarre stars, one that had already spanned some 40 years worth of effort.

Żytkow said upon the discovery: "I am extremely happy that observational confirmation of our theoretical prediction has started to emerge. Since Kip Thorne and I proposed our models of stars with neutron cores, people were not able to disprove our work. If theory is sound, experimental confirmation shows up sooner or later. So it was a matter of identification of a promising group of stars, getting telescope time and proceeding with the project.”

Personal life 
Żytkow's career was interrupted by a mountaineering accident that nearly took her life.

Kuiper belt discoveries

In December 1995, Mike Irwin, Scott Tremaine, and Anna N. Żytkow collaborated on the survey of two slow-moving objects, which are probable members of the Kuiper belt. Żytkow and the group followed Edgeworth (1949) and Kuipers (1951) research, which indicates that protoplanetary disks extend beyond Neptune and that the disk material beyond Neptune had not coalesced into planets. This group of planetesimals is now known as the Kuiper belt. Żytkow and the rest of the group members spent most of their time adjusting the focus of the camera and instruments attached to the Isaac Newton Telescope (INT). The group used the Monte Carlo method, which provided multiple simulations in two separate stages. The first stage is the detection rate for images that came from INT as a function of magnitude, which was investigated using artificial images adding to the original frames. The second stage involved examining the detection rate for a series of artificial images from INT that followed the typical slow moving solar system objects (SMO) track. The outcome of this survey was a detection of two new Kuiper belts objects within the area of 0.7 degree sq. to a limiting magnitude mR=23.5.

Publications 
 The proper motion of HV2112: a TŻO candidate in the SMC; Monthly Notices of the Royal Astronomical Society Letters; Mar. 2016; Clare C. Worley, Mike J. Irwin, Christopher Tout, Anna N. Żytkow, Morgan Fraser, Robert G. Izzard:  
 A Search for Thorne-Zytkow Objects; American Astronomical Society; January 2014; Emily M. Levesque  Philip Massey  Anna N. Żytkow  Nidia Morrell: 
 HV2112, a Thorne-Zytkow Object or a Super Asymptotic Giant Branch Star; Monthly Notices of the Royal Astronomical Society Letters; 23 June 2014; Christopher Tout, Anna N. Zytkow, Ross P. Church, Herbert Ho Bun Lau: 
 Discovery of a Thorne-Zytkow object candidate in the Small Magellanic Cloud; Monthly Notices of the Royal Astronomical Society Letters; September 2014; Emily M. Levesque, Philip Massey, Anna N. Zytkow, Nidia Morrell: 
 Quasi-stars, giants and the Schönberg–Chandrasekhar (SC) limit; Monthly Notices of the Royal Astronomical Society; January 2012; Warrick H. Ball, Christopher Tout, Anna N. Żytkow: 
 FY Aquilae and the gamma-ray burst GB 790331; Astrophysical Journal, part 2, vol. 433, no. 2, p. L81-L84; 12 July 1994; Mike Irwin, Anna N. Zytkow: 
 A variable star in the vicinity of the soft γ-ray repeater 1806 – 20; Monthly Notices of the Royal Astronomical Society, vol. 263, iss. 1; 1 July 1993; Mike Irwin  Anna N. Żytkow: 
 The structure and evolution of Thorne-Zytkow objects; Astrophysical Journal, part 1, vol. 386; Feb. 10, 1992;Robert C. Cannon, P. P. Eggleton, A. N. Zytkow, P. Podsiadlowski: 
 Giant and supergiant stars with degenerate neutron cores; Astrophysical Journal, Part 1; Chris Eich; Mark E. Zimmermann; Kip S. Thorne; Anna N. Zytkow; 1 November 1989 : 
 Stationary spherical accretion into black holes. I - Equations of structure; Monthly Notices of the Royal Astronomical Society, vol. 194; Feb., 1981; Kip S. Thorne;  Richard A. Flammang, Anna N. Zytkow: 
 Hydrogen shell flashes in a white dwarf with mass accretion; Astrophysical Journal, Part 1, vol. 222; 1 June 1978; Bohdan Paczynski, Anna N. Zytkow: 
 Stars with degenerate neutron cores. I - Structure of equilibrium models; Astrophysical Journal, part 1, vol. 212; Mar. 15, 1977; Kip S. Thorne;, Anna N. Zytkow; 
 The relativistic equations of stellar structure and evolution. Stars with degenerate neutron cores. 1: Structure of equilibrium models; Astrophysical Journal, part 1, vol. 212; Mar. 15, 1977; Kip S. Thorne;, Anna N. Zytkow: 
 Red giants and supergiants with degenerate neutron cores neutron cores. 1: Structure of equilibrium models; Astrophysical Journal, vol. 199; 1 July 1975; Kip S. Thorne;, Anna N. Zytkow:

References

External links 
 Publications

1947 births
Astronomers at the University of Cambridge
Discoverers of minor planets
Discoveries by Anna N. Żytkow
Living people
Polish astrophysicists
Polish women physicists
Women astrophysicists
University of Warsaw alumni